Lego DC Comics Super Heroes: Justice League – Gotham City Breakout is a 2016 American computer-animated superhero comedy film based on the Lego and DC Comics brands, which was released on June 21, 2016 in Digital HD and on July 12, 2016 on Blu-ray and DVD. It is the sixth Lego DC Comics film following Lego Batman: The Movie – DC Super Heroes Unite, Lego DC Comics: Batman Be-Leaguered, Lego DC Comics Super Heroes: Justice League vs. Bizarro League, Lego DC Comics Super Heroes: Justice League – Attack of the Legion of Doom and Lego DC Comics Super Heroes: Justice League – Cosmic Clash. Some actors from various DC properties reprise their respective roles, including Nolan North as Superman, Grey DeLisle as Wonder Woman and Troy Baker as Batman. The film received positive reviews, with praise for the action, although the consumerism was criticized.

Plot
 
Batman and Robin chase Penguin and Harley Quinn. After Harley and Poison Ivy are defeated, Batman leaves Robin with the defeated criminals and chases after a criminal who resembles a ninja. After cornering the criminal in an alleyway, Batman is able to deduce that the criminal is Nightwing who used the ninja costume to try and lure Batman into a surprise birthday party which disappoints Nightwing along with the other attendees of Batman's party (consisting of Robin, Batgirl, Justice League members Superman, Wonder Woman, and Cyborg, and Teen Titans members Beast Boy and Starfire). Batgirl, Robin and Nightwing reveal that as a present for Batman, they decided to take him on vacation. Superman is willing to serve as a temporary replacement of Batman, believing the criminals of Gotham would not be hard to defeat due to many of them lacking superpowers. The Justice League and Teen Titans are able to convince Batman to accept the vacation and Batman, Nightwing and Batgirl leave to their holiday plans. Robin stays behind to show Superman the ropes and give him advice on Gotham's villains.

Meanwhile, at Arkham Asylum, Joker uses a spoon (which he drew a face on and calls "Spoony") to dig himself out of his cell. Elsewhere, Batman easily figures out Nightwing and Batgirl's vacation plans for him, to take him down Memory Lane by having him visit the dojo of his former martial arts sensei Madame Mantis. After a brief reunion battle with his former sensei, Batman discovers it was actually a disguised minion of Deathstroke. Batman, Batgirl, and Nightwing then find Deathstroke and follow him into a cave.

Meanwhile, in Gotham City, Superman finds out about Joker's escape and ignores Robin's warning about him. Unfortunately, this allows Joker to trick Superman into freeing Harley Quinn, Penguin, Poison Ivy and Scarecrow from Arkham. Superman calls Cyborg in hopes of gaining assistance to stop the escaped villains.

Batman, Nightwing, and Batgirl end up falling down a waterfall in the cave. Batman explains his past with Deathstroke. At the bottom of the waterfall, Batman, Nightwing, and Batgirl discover an underground kingdom of Trogowogs (a hidden underground race of short, green humanoids). The primitive (yet optimistic, prim and proper) residents immediately attack Batman, who ultimately surrenders to Deathstroke when the latter threatens to kill Nightwing and Batgirl. They are then introduced to the Trogowog leader who turns out to be Bane, who gained his position with the use of a pink crystal known as the Psyche Stone.

Back in Gotham City, Superman and Cyborg are easily defeated by Poison Ivy. Superman reluctantly summons Wonder Woman, but Poison Ivy is able to coat all three of them in her pheromones to stun them. By the time the effect wears off, they have been taken to Joker's funhouse where all the escaped villains are present and Scarecrow is able to douse the Justice Leaguers with fear gas, making them cowardly enough for the villains to torment them long enough to put them in molten Kryptonite and more pheromones to boil them into soup. Robin notices this and goes to save the Justice League.

Back in the Trogowog kingdom, Batman, Nightwing and Batgirl are held in the dungeon, stripped of their utility belts and imprisoned with Madame Mantis and the Trogowogs' cowardly prince Grungle (the only Trogowog not to fall victim of the Psyche Stone). Prince Grungle reveals that the Trogowogs were once a peaceful and friendly race until Bane found out about their kingdom and used the Psyche Stone to teach them hatred and violence. In addition, he killed Grungle's father and locked away Grungle. Luckily for the prisoners, Batman stashed away a brick separator and uses it to break them free. Unfortunately, they are recaptured after Bane threatens to kill them and Batman reluctantly succumbs to the Psyche Stone's power (while repeatedly saying "Dance") and reveals how to use the "Forbidden Move," which involves harnessing one's own chi to create a projectile of destructive power.

Back in Gotham City, Robin is able to save the captive Justice League members and they shake off the pheromones. Robin and the Justice League then leave the amusement park, causing the villains to believe that Gotham City is now defenseless and theirs for the taking. Superman apologizes for ignoring Robin's warnings and Robin teaches the Justice League the skills they need to defeat the villains.

In Gotham City, Scarecrow, Penguin, and Poison Ivy are defeated by Robin and the Justice League and are put back in Arkham Asylum. Joker and Harley Quinn have managed to tie Commissioner James Gordon to the Bat-Signal until the Justice League arrive, free Commissioner Gordon, and send Joker and Harley back to Arkham as well as confiscate "Spoony" so that Joker can't dig his way out again. Joker ends up having to eat the asylum food with his hands.

In the Trogowog kingdom, Bane is locked in the dungeon, Prince Grungle is made the new king, and Deathstroke bids farewell to Batman (although he states that the team-up didn't mean they were friends). Batman, Nightwing, and Batgirl use the Psyche Stone to erase the Forbidden Move from the Trogowogs memories and restore them to their normal, peaceful and friendly selves. They then leave back to Gotham and say their goodbyes.

Back in the Batcave, The Justice League and Teen Titans discuss not to mention any of the events that happened while Batman was gone. When Batman, Batgirl and Nightwing do return, Superman confesses. To his surprise, Batman actually congratulates him, Wonder Woman, Cyborg and Robin for putting them back in Arkham. The Justice League and Teen Titans then continue their party.

Cast
 Troy Baker as Bruce Wayne / Batman
 Eric Bauza as Bane, Commissioner Gordon
 Greg Cipes as Garfield Logan / Beast Boy
 John DiMaggio as Deathstroke, Scarecrow
 Will Friedle as Nightwing / Dick Grayson
 Grey Griffin as Diana Prince / Wonder Woman
 Amy Hill as Madame Mantis
 Sarah Hyland as Batgirl
 Vanessa Marshall as Poison Ivy
 Scott Menville as Robin / Damian Wayne
 Nolan North as Kal-El/Clark Kent / Superman
 Tom Kenny as Penguin
 Khary Payton as Victor Stone / Cyborg
 Jason Spisak as Joker, Grungle
 Tara Strong as Harley Quinn
 Hynden Walch as Koriand'r / Starfire

In the end credits, the acknowledgement for the Batman should appear as "Batman created by Bob Kane with Bill Finger" as stated in the September 2015 DC Entertainment announcement.

Reception

The film earned $1,297,406 from domestic DVD sales and $509,376 from domestic Blu-ray sales, bringing its total domestic home video earnings to $1,806,782.

References

External links
 Lego DC Comics Super Heroes: Justice League: Gotham City Breakout at the Internet Movie Database
 

2016 direct-to-video films
2016 animated films
Lego Batman films
Films about sentient toys
2010s superhero comedy films
Animated films based on video games
2010s American animated films
2010s direct-to-video animated superhero films
Gotham City Breakout
Films directed by Matt Peters
2010s English-language films